Stade Joseph-Moynat is a multi-purpose stadium in Thonon-les-Bains, France. It is currently used for American football matches and is the home stadium of Thonon Black Panthers. The stadium is able to hold from 3,000 to 6,000 people. It is also the home of association football club Thonon Evian Grand Genève F.C.

References 

Football venues in France
Athletics (track and field) venues in France
Thonon Evian Grand Genève F.C.
Sports venues in Haute-Savoie
American football venues in Europe
Olympique Thonon Chablais
Multi-purpose stadiums